This is a list of all cricketers who have coached Indian national cricket team at the international level. India became a full member of the Imperial Cricket Conference  (now the International Cricket Council) on 30 May 1926. On 25 June 1932 it became the Test nation after England, Australia, South Africa, the West Indies and New Zealand when they took on England at Lord's. They played only seven tests, which were all against England, before the Second World War, losing five matches and drawing twice. Their first game against other opposition came in 1947–49 when they played Australia.

The Indian team's greatest successes came in 1983, when they won the Cricket World Cup under the captaincy of Kapil Dev, and 2011, when they won the world cup again under Mahendra Singh Dhoni. Also, they won the Under-19 World Cup five times under the captaincy of Mohammad Kaif in 2000, 2008 under Virat Kohli, 2012 under Unmukt Chand, 2018 under Prithvi Shaw and in 2022 under the captaincy of Yash Dhull. Also, under the captaincy of Mahendra Singh Dhoni, India won the inaugural ICC T20 World Cup and ICC Champions trophy 2013. India came runner-up in World Cup 2003 and also won ICC Champions trophy in 2002 under Saurav Ganguly. Virat Kohli has the record of most Indian test wins under his leadership. Mithali Raj led India to its best result in Women's ODI cricket when the team advanced to the finals of the 2005 and 2017 Women's Cricket World Cup. Raj is also one of the three women's captains who have led their side to a victory in women's Test cricket, the others being Shantha Rangaswamy and Mamatha Maben. Under Harmanpreet Kaur's captaincy Women's cricket team advanced, for the first time, to the final of 2020 Women's T20 Cricket World Cup.

List of head coaches in all formats

See also
 List of India national cricket captains

References

External links
CricketArchive
Cricinfo

Wisden Cricketers' Almanack

Coaches
Coaches of the Indian national cricket team